Kukimun is a village in the Churachanpur district of Manipur, India.

References

Villages in Churachandpur district